I Love You is an Indian Kannada-language romantic drama film written, directed and produced by R. Chandru. It completed 100 days in many theatres. The film features Upendra, Rachita Ram and Sonu Gowda in the lead roles. The film is the second collaboration of Upendra and director Chandru after the successful Brahma (2014).

The film is based on Upendra's earlier movies A, Upendra and Uppi 2. The cinematography of the film was done by Sugunaan. The music for the film was scored by Dr. Kiran Thaotambyle, Indra K.M, and Aria Dakshin. The movie was reported to be similar to the 2007 English movie I Think I Love My Wife which itself was based on the 1972 French movie Love in the Afternoon.

Premise 
Santhosh, a happy-go-lucky man, believes that love is trumpcard for lust. Dharmika, who aspires to take a PhD believes that love is divine. How she changes his mind is crux of the plot.

Cast 
Upendra as Santhosh
Rachita Ram as Dharmika 
Sonu Gowda as Gowri
PD Sathish Chandra
Sayaji Shinde
Brahmanandam as Santhosh's PA
Jai Jagadish
Honnavalli Krishna as Santhosh's father
Nitesh Nittur

Soundtrack 
The film's music has been scored by Dr. Kiran Thaotambyle, Indra K.M, and Aria Dakshin. The audio rights of the film was bought by Lahari Music.

Release 

The film was initially scheduled to release on 14 February 2019 on Valentine's Day. Later, they postponed it to April, but as the lead actor was contesting in the Indian elections 2019, it was again rescheduled to release in the month of June, after the elections. The film was released on 14 June 2019

References

External sources
 
 I Love You – FilmiBeat

2019 films
2010s Kannada-language films
Indian romantic drama films
2019 romantic drama films
Films directed by R. Chandru